The third GeGeGe no Kitarō anime was aired from October 12, 1985 to March 21, 1988. It ran for 115 episodes. At Episode 109 the series became 
. Like the other adaptations, it was produced by Toei Animation and broadcast on Fuji TV.

An English subtitled version was broadcast on the Nippon Golden Network in the early 1990s in Hawaii. Recordings of the subtitled version are rare, since they were never rebroadcast.

Episode list

Blu-ray SD release

Region 2 (Japan)

References

1985